The Cena or Coena Cypriani (i.e. "Feast of Cyprian") is an anonymous prose work written in Latin. Tradition ascribes original authorship to the 3rd-century saint Cyprian, bishop of Carthage, but the text was probably written around 400. There is not a full consensus on this date: according to Arthur Lapôtre, it was written under the rule of the Emperor Julian the Apostate (361-363). 

The text tells the story of a banquet held at Cana, where a great king (i.e. God) invites many biblical figures to attend a wedding. Interpretations of the intent of the work have often radically diverged: it has been viewed both as a didactic work, albeit an unusual one, and as an example of biblical parody. In Bayless' words, it should be read as an "allegory parodying allegoresis and biblical exegesis".       

While on linguistic grounds nobody argues anymore that Saint Cyprian is the author, attempts have been made to attribute the work to other authors. One of the first to study the piece carefully was Adolf von Harnack, who argued for it having been written by the poet Cyprianus Gallus on the grounds of its using the Acta Pauli. This view is endorsed by H. Brewer, but opposed by Willy Hass, who argues that Cyprianus and the Cena author made use of different versions of the Bible. Despite this, Hass agrees that on textual evidence the Cena it came from northern Italy. A different attribution has been made by Lapôtre, who claimed the work to be a satire directed toward Julian the Apostate by the poet Bachiarius.

The work was very popular in the Middle Ages to the point that it was read during the coronation of the Carolingian Emperor Charles the Bald in 875. Many retellings of the story were written in the Middle Ages, the earliest and best-known of which are in the 9th century by Johannes Hymonides and Rabanus Maurus. 

54 manuscripts of the work survive, the oldest from the 9th century. The work was first printed in 1564 in a collection of the works of Cyprian of Carthage. The Cena has had a recent return to fame due to its role in the novel The Name of the Rose by Umberto Eco.

References

Sources
 Abrantes, Miguel Carvalho (2018), Feast of Cyprian: The "Coena Cypriani" translated to English. KDP.

Religious parodies and satires
5th-century Latin books
 Bayless, Martha, Parody in the Middle Ages: The Latin Tradition (Ann Arbor: University of Michigan Press, 1996)
 Dolezalová, Lucie, "Receptions of Obscurity and Obscurities of Reception: The Case of the Cena Cypriani," Listy filologické / Folia philologica 125: 3/4 (2002), pp. 187-197
 Dolezalová, Lucie, Reception and Its Varieties: Reading, Re-Writing, and Understanding "Cena Cypriani" in the Middle Ages (Trier: Wissenschaftlicher Verlag, 2007)
 Modesto, Christine, Studien zur Cena Cypriani und zu deren Rezeption (Tübingen: G. Narr, 1992)